The 2015 season was Kelantan FA's 7th season in the Malaysia Super League and 20th successive season in the top flight of Malaysian football league system. They will also compete in FA Cup and Malaysia Cup. For the first time since 2012, they will not compete in AFC Cup.

Friendlies

Pre-season

During season

After season

Competition

Super League 

The league will kick-off on 31 January 2015.

Table

Goal scorers for Super League

6 goal

 Gilmar Jose da Silva Filho
 Mohd Nor Farhan Muhammad

5 goal

 Erwin Carrillo

3 goal

 Mohd Badhri Mohd Radzi
 Wan Zack Haikal
 Austin Amutu

2 goal

 Noor Hazrul Mustafa
 Wan Zaharulnizam
 Jonathan McKain

1 goal

 Amirizdwan Taj Tajuddin
 Mohd Khairul Izuan Rosli
 Ahmad Fakri Saarani

FA Cup 

The draw for the competition was made on 14 December 2014 with games expected to start in February 2015.

Malaysia Cup

The draw for the 2015 Malaysia Cup was held on 27 August 2015 at the Hilton Hotel Petaling Jaya and Kelantan FA was drawn into group C which is arguably the “Group of Death” consisting of 32-time winners Selangor FA, previous season semi-finalist Felda United F.C. and T-Team F.C.. Their Journey in Malaysia Cup ended after they finished in third place behind 2015 Malaysia Cup semi-finalist, Felda United F.C. and champion, Selangor FA.

Group stage

Player statistics

Squad 
On 1 December 2014, Tan Sri Annuar Musa has announced the 2015 provisional squad for Kelantan. It was finalized before the transfer window closed on 12 a.m., Friday 5 December 2014.

Key:
 = Appearances,
 = Goals,
 = Yellow card,
 = Red card
(Player names in italics denotes player that left mid-season)

Goalscorers 

11 goals

 Gilmar Jose da Silva Filho

9 goals

 Austin Amutu

6 goals

 Nor Farhan Muhammad
 Erwin Carrillo

5 goals

 Wan Zack Haikal
 Mohd Badhri Mohd Radzi

3 goals

 Wan Zaharulnizam Zakaria

2 goals

 Noor Hazrul Mustafa
 Jonathan McKain

1 goal

 Emmanuel Kenmogne
 Mohd Khairul Izuan Rosli
 Amirizdwan Taj Tajuddin
 Ahmad Fakri Saarani

Transfers and Loans

Transfers in

Transfers out

Loans in

Loans Out

Club officials

Coaching and medical staff 
 Manager-Haji Azman Ibrahim
 Assistant manager-Wan Badri Wan Omar
 Head coach-Zahasmi Ismail 
 Assistant coach-Mohd Hashim Mustapha, Mohd Nafuzi Muhamad Zain and Sidek Shamsudin
 Goalkeeping coach-Ismail Chawalit Abu Bakar
 Fitness coach- Luka Basic
 Physiotherapist-Mohd Zainudin Zakaria and Ahmad Faris Musa

Backroom staff 
 Kit manager- Harun Ismail
 Media official- Zuki Deraman
 Security official-Fared bin Abdul Ghani or Dato'Mohd Farek

See also
 List of Kelantan FA seasons

Notes

References

2015
Malaysian football clubs 2015 season
Kelantan FA